USS S-22 (SS-127) was a first-group (S-1 or "Holland") S-class submarine of the United States Navy in commission from 1924 to 1942. Prior to World War II, she operated in the Atlantic Ocean, Caribbean Sea, and Pacific Ocean, and after the United States entered the war, she operated off Panama. She then served in the Royal Navy as HMS P.554 from 1942 to 1944.

Construction and commissioning
S-22′s keel was laid down on 6 January 1919 by the Bethlehem Shipbuilding Corporation's Fore River Shipyard at Quincy, Massachusetts. She was launched on  15 July 1920 sponsored by Mrs. Mark C. Bowman, and commissioned on  23 June 1924.

Service history

U.S. Navy 1924–1942
In addition to duty off the northeastern coast of the United States from New London, Connecticut, from 1924 through 1930, S-22 visited Hawaii from 27 April to 25 May 1925. She operated in the Panama Canal Zone area from February through April 1926 and visited Kingston, Jamaica, from 20 to 28 March 1927. She served again in the Panama Canal area in the late winter and early spring of 1928, 1929, and 1930.

Departing New London on 5 January 1931, S-22 cruised via the Panama Canal and California to Hawaii, arriving at Pearl Harbor on 25 April 1931. From then into 1938, S-22 operated in Hawaiian waters. Departing from Pearl Harbor on 15 October 1938, S-22 returned to New London on 11 December 1938, where she joined a test and evaluation division. Occasionally, she was employed in training United States Naval Academy midshipmen at Annapolis, Maryland, and assisting the diving school at Piney Point, Maryland.

After duty at Key West, Florida, from December 1940 to May 1941 and overhaul during the latter half of 1941, S-22 served in the Panama Canal area from January to March 1942. She returned to New London on 17 April 1942.

Royal Navy 1942–1944
S-22 was decommissioned on 19 June 1942 and was transferred to the United Kingdom for service in the Royal Navy as HMS P.554. The Royal Navy returned her to the U.S. Navy at Philadelphia, Pennsylvania, on 11 July 1944.

U.S. Navy 1944–1945
S-22 subsequently served as a sonar target at New London and in tests at the U.S. Naval Experimental Facility at Minas Basin, Nova Scotia.

Disposal
S-22 was struck from the Naval Vessel Register in August 1945. Her hulk was sold for scrapping on 16 November 1945 to the North American Smelting Company in Philadelphia.

Honors and awards
  American Defense Service Medal

References 

 

United States S-class submarines
Ships built in Quincy, Massachusetts
1920 ships
World War II submarines of the United States
Ships transferred from the United States Navy to the Royal Navy
United States S-class submarines of the Royal Navy
World War II submarines of the United Kingdom